Conus viola, common name the violet cone, is a species of sea snail, a marine gastropod mollusk in the family Conidae, the cone snails and their allies.

Like all species within the genus Conus, these snails are predatory and venomous. They are capable of "stinging" humans, therefore live ones should be handled carefully or not at all.

Description
The size of the shell varies between 22 mm and 54 mm.

Distribution
This marine species occurs off Okinawa, Japan and between the Philippines and North and Northwestern Australia

References

 Walter A. Cernohorsky, Conus viola , a new name for C. violaceus, Reeve; The Nautilus, v. 91 (1977)
 Tucker J.K. & Tenorio M.J. (2009) Systematic classification of Recent and fossil conoidean gastropods. Hackenheim: Conchbooks. 296 pp.

External links
 The Conus Biodiversity website
 Cone Shells – Knights of the Sea
 

viola
Gastropods described in 1977